Mister International 2022 was the 14th edition of the Mister International pageant, held on October 30, 2022, at the New Frontier Theater in Quezon City, Philippines. Enmanuel “Manu” Franco of the Dominican Republic was hailed the winner by the end of the event.

Background

Selection of participants 
Contestants from 35 countries and territories have been selected to compete in the competition. The 2022 edition was known as the 14th edition of Mister International after a three-year hiatus from the COVID-19 pandemic. 

The 2022 edition will see the debut of Albania, Cuba, Laos, and Sierra Leone, returning countries from France, Kazakhstan, Myanmar, and withdrawals from Australia, China, Norway, Slovenia, and Sweden. 

Delegates were winners from their national pageants or appointed to their positions after being a runner-up in their national pageant between 2019 and 2022 and/or being selected through a casting process.

Results

Placements

Special awards

Contestants
35 contestants competed for the title:

Notes

References

External links
Official Website
Official Instagram

2022 beauty pageants
Mister International